Pouilly may refer to:

 Pouilly, Moselle, a commune in the Moselle department, France
 Pouilly, Oise, a commune in the Oise department, France

It can also refer to 
 Pouilly-sur-Loire, a commune in the Nièvre department in central France
 Pouilly Fumé, a white wine produced in Pouilly-sur-Loire
 Pouilly-sur-Loire AOC, an Appellation d'Origine Contrôlée in Pouilly-sur-Loire
 Three white wines from the Mâconnais district of Burgundy, France:
 Pouilly-Fuissé
 Pouilly-Loché
 Pouilly-Vinzelles